Dale Mark Paul Garland (born 13 October 1980) is a Guernsey born British athlete, educated at Elizabeth College, Guernsey. He competed in the 400m hurdles at the 2007 World Athletics Championships and attended the 2008 Summer Olympics as part of the 4 × 400 m relay squad, but did not run in the competition.

Competitive record

Commonwealth Games
 2002 – 9th (Decathlon)
 2006 - 5th (Decathlon)
 2010 - Heats (400m hurdles, 4 × 400 m)

AAA Championships

 2004 Silver (400m hurdles)
 2005 Silver (400m hurdles)
 2006 4th (400m hurdles)
 2007 Gold (400m hurdles)
 2009 Bronze (400m hurdles)

European Indoor Championships
 2005 Silver (4 × 400 m relay)
 2005 6th (400m)
 2007 Gold (4 × 400 m relay)

Island Games
 2011 Silver (400m hurdles)

References

1980 births
Living people
British decathletes
British male hurdlers
Guernsey male hurdlers
Olympic male hurdlers
Olympic athletes of Great Britain
Athletes (track and field) at the 2008 Summer Olympics
Commonwealth Games competitors for Guernsey
Athletes (track and field) at the 2002 Commonwealth Games
Athletes (track and field) at the 2006 Commonwealth Games
Athletes (track and field) at the 2010 Commonwealth Games
British Athletics Championships winners
AAA Championships winners
World Athletics Championships athletes for Great Britain
People educated at Elizabeth College, Guernsey
European Athletics Indoor Championships winners